HMS Siren (or Syren) was a 28-gun  sixth-rate frigate of the Royal Navy.  Siren was first commissioned in August 1775 under the command of Captain Tobias Furneaux, her only commanding officer.

Service
She took part in the Battle of the Rice Boats on 2–3 March 1776 on the border between the Province of Georgia and the Province of South Carolina and in the Battle of Sullivan's Island of 28 June 1776 upon Charleston, South Carolina.

Fate
Siren, escorting a convoy in poor visibility, ran aground at about 6:00 am on 6 November 1777 near Point Judith, along with two other ships.  Efforts were made to bring her off, but American forces ashore brought up field artillery and prevented salvage operations.  Siren was abandoned with the loss of 2 killed and 5 wounded.

Post script
The sloop Mary Ann, which had a diving machine, arrived at Newport, Rhode Island on 24 July 1815. She had retrieved Syrens best bower anchor and a quantity of iron knees.

Notes

Citations

Bibliography
 Robert Gardiner, The First Frigates, Conway Maritime Press, London 1992. .
 David Lyon, The Sailing Navy List, Conway Maritime Press, London 1993. .
 Rif Winfield, British Warships in the Age of Sail, 1714 to 1792, Seaforth Publishing, London 2007. .

External links
 

 

1773 ships
Sixth-rate frigates of the Royal Navy
Ships built in Chatham